Anton Wede (born 20 April 1990) is a Swedish footballer who plays for Norrby as a midfielder.

Club career
On 7 February 2022, Wede joined Norrby on a two-year deal.

References

External links

1990 births
People from Fagersta Municipality
Living people
Swedish footballers
Association football midfielders
IF Elfsborg players
Falkenbergs FF players
Helsingborgs IF players
GAIS players
Norrby IF players
Allsvenskan players
Superettan players
Sportspeople from Västmanland County